Tiel Passewaaij is a railway station located in Tiel, Netherlands.

History

The station originally opened on 14 April 2007 and is located on the Elst–Dordrecht railway. Train services are currently operated by NS.

Train services

Bus services

External links
NS website 
Dutch Public Transport journey planner 

Railway stations in Gelderland
Railway stations opened in 2007
Tiel